The 2009 110sport.tv Legends of Snooker was a professional non-ranking snooker tournament that took place between 31 October–1 November 2009 at Rothes Hall in Glenrothes, Scotland. The tournament was won by Stephen Hendry, who defeated Ken Doherty 5–3 in the final.

Main draw

References

2009 in snooker
2009 in Scottish sport
Senior sports competitions
Snooker competitions in Scotland
Glenrothes